Jean Rolin may refer to:
 Jean Rolin (writer), French writer and journalist
 Jean Rolin (cardinal), French bishop and cardinal
 Jean VI Rolin, his son, French bishop
 Master of Jean Rolin II (15th century), anonymous artist

See also
 Jean Rollin, French film director, actor, and novelist